Ken Babby is an American businessperson. He is the Founder & Chief Executive Officer of Fast Forward Sports Group. Previously, Babby served as Chief Revenue Officer/ Vice President and General Manager, Digital for The Washington Post. Presently, he is the Owner of the Jacksonville Jumbo Shrimp (AAA Affiliate of the Miami Marlins) & Akron RubberDucks (AA Cleveland Guardians) baseball teams.

Early life
In his youth, Ken Babby was a fan of the Baltimore Orioles. He often attended this games with his father, Lon Babby, who was General Counsel for the team, and was later president of basketball operations for the Phoenix Suns. His mother is author Ellen Babby. Babby attended Wheaton College (Massachusetts) where he graduated with a dual degree in Computer Science and Economics. Babby later graduated with an MBA from Johns Hopkins University.

The Washington Post
Babby began working at The Washington Post as of 1999, beginning as an intern in the IT department, and joined the IT department full-time in 2002. He then began working in advertising, eventually becoming vice president of advertising for the Post. He remained with the Post until 2012, when he left from his position as chief revenue officer and general manager, Digital. He was the youngest senior official in the company's history.

Minor League Baseball
In 2012, at the age of 32, Babby acquired the Akron Aeros Double-A minor league baseball team of the Cleveland Guardians organization, and renamed the team the Akron RubberDucks in 2014. In 2016 the team won the Eastern League championship, and that same year they hosted the Eastern League All-Star Game. The team's stadium also underwent a $8.0 million privately funded renovation since Babby's ownership.

In 2015 Babby acquired the Jacksonville Suns Double-A minor league baseball team of the Southern League, a part of the Miami Marlins organization, and renamed the team the Jacksonville Jumbo Shrimp in 2016. Additionally, Babby invested $2 million renovating the team's home, the Baseball Grounds of Jacksonville. In 2020, the club announced a historic naming rights partnership with 121 Financial, renaming the ballpark 121 Financial Ballpark. The Jumbo Shrimp were invited to become the AAA Affiliate of the Miami Marlins ahead of the 2021 season.

Both his teams are operated by his company the Fast Forward Sports Group. For both, he reduced ticket prices and revamped the concession stands, with the goal of providing a family friendly environment. In 2016 Babby was also named to the Sports Business Journal's 40 under 40 list, and a regional Ernst and Young Entrepreneur of the Year recipient. Babby currently serves on the MLB PDL (Professional Development League) Executive Board.

Boards
Babby serves on the Wheaton College board of trustees., Jacksonville University Board of Trustees, and the Board of Baptist Health System (Downtown Jacksonville Campus); He also serves on the boards of the Cleveland Sports Commission and the Jacksonville Chamber of Commerce. Ken is currently serving a two-year term as board chair, Visit Jacksonville.

Personal life
Ken is married to Liz Bryan, an executive vice president of Spectrum, and has a 13-year-old son, Josh. Ken is also the son of former lawyer, Washington Redskins attorney, Baltimore Orioles attorney, sports agent, and Phoenix Suns President of Basketball Operations and senior advisor in Lon Babby.

References

Living people
Johns Hopkins Carey Business School alumni
Wheaton College (Massachusetts) alumni
The Washington Post people
Year of birth missing (living people)